Bartłomiej Dudzic (born 18 August 1988) is a Polish footballer who plays as a forward for Niwa Nowa Wieś.

External links
 
 

1988 births
Living people
MKS Cracovia (football) players
GKS Katowice players
Sandecja Nowy Sącz players
Ekstraklasa players
I liga players
Polish footballers
People from Oświęcim
Sportspeople from Lesser Poland Voivodeship
Association football forwards